Amos is the second studio album by American country music singer Michael Ray. It was released via Atlantic Nashville on June 1, 2018. Its lead single, "Get to You", has charted in the top 20 on the Billboard Country Airplay chart. Ray named the album after his late grandfather, who was the inspiration for most of the tracks on the album.

Commercial performance
The album debuted on Billboards Top Country Albums at number 5, with 6,700 copies sold.  It sold an additional 1,600 copies in the second week. It has sold 16,600 copies in the United States as of April 2019.

Track listing

Personnel
Perry Coleman - background vocals
Paul DiGiovanni - electric guitar, programming, synthesizer
David Dorn - keyboards, piano, synthesizer
Tony Lucido - bass guitar
Rob McNelley - electric guitar
Miles McPherson - drums, percussion
Gordon Mote - organ, piano, Wurlitzer
Russ Pahl - pedal steel guitar
Danny Rader - banjo, bouzouki, acoustic guitar, hi-string guitar
Michael Ray - lead vocals
Jordan Schmidt - programming, synthesizer, background vocals
Adam Shoenfeld - electric guitar
Derek Wells - electric guitar
Nir Z. - drums, percussion, programming

Charts

References

2018 albums
Michael Ray (singer) albums
Atlantic Records albums
Albums produced by Scott Hendricks